Estigmene laglaizei is a species of moth of the family Erebidae. It is found in Senegal.

References

Moths described in 1910
Spilosomina
Insects of West Africa
Moths of Africa